Daniel "Dan" Joyce (born May 17, 1961) is a Canadian-born Australian curler.

At the international level, he is a  curler.

He played for Australia at the 1992 Winter Olympics where curling was a demonstration event. There, the Australian men's team finished in seventh place.

Teams and events

References

External links

 

Living people
1961 births
Curlers from Winnipeg
Australian male curlers
Curlers at the 1992 Winter Olympics
Olympic curlers of Australia
Pacific-Asian curling champions
Sportspeople from Melbourne